Stefan Maurer (6 October 1960 – 28 January 1994) was a Swiss cyclist. He competed in the individual road race event at the 1984 Summer Olympics. He drowned in a diving accident in Thailand in 1994.

References

External links
 

1960 births
1994 deaths
Swiss male cyclists
Olympic cyclists of Switzerland
Cyclists at the 1984 Summer Olympics
People from Schaffhausen
Sportspeople from the canton of Schaffhausen
Deaths by drowning